Tahsin Yazıcı (1892 in Monastir – February 11, 1971 in Ankara) was an Ottoman Army officer and later a Turkish Army general and politician.

Biography 

He was born to his father Ali Bey and his mother Ganimet Hanım in Monastir, Ottoman Empire (present-day Bitola, North Macedonia) in 1892. He was recorded in Kefçedede wards, Üsküdar District of Istanbul Province. He entered the Ottoman Military Academy in Istanbul, Turkey on November 1, 1909, and graduated from the academy as second lieutenant on March 1, 1912. After graduation, he served during the First World War in Gallipoli and he was promoted to the rank of lieutenant on March 1, 1916. He then served during the Turkish War of Independence and was promoted to the rank of captain on October 10, 1920. In 1925, he participated in quelling the Sheikh Said rebellion. He married Nezahat Hanım (1904–1996) in 1929. They had a son, Ahmet Bali (1931–). He was then sent to France to learn cavalry warfare. After returning to Turkey, he was appointed to the teaching staff of the Cavalry School. Tahsin Yazıcı was promoted to the rank of major on August 30, 1931.  In 1935, he was assigned as commander of the tank battalion that was the first tank unit of Turkey. In 1937, he returned to the Cavalry School and was promoted to the rank of lieutenant colonel on August 30, 1938, and then colonel on August 30, 1943. As a Colonel between 1943 and 1946, he served as ADC to the Chief of General Staff Toydemir.

He commanded the Turkish Brigade during the Korean War. His brigade saved Americans in Battle of Kunuri. Though it was initially placed as a reserve for the U.S. 8th Army, the collapse of the front in the face of massive Chinese attacks on 26 November 1950 meant that it soon found itself in the thick of battle.

Having retired from the Army in 1952, he served as a member of parliament in the ruling Democratic Party from 1954. In 1956 he was appointed Turkey's Ambassador to Israel until 1959. After the 1960 military coup his party was suppressed, and he spent three years in prison before being released.

Sources

External links
 Kore savaşı unutulmasın 
 Heroes of the Korean War: General Tahsin Yazıcı 

1892 births
1971 deaths
People from Bitola
Turkish Military Academy alumni
Ottoman Army officers
Ottoman military personnel of World War I
Turkish military personnel of the Turkish War of Independence
Sheikh Said rebellion
Turkish Army generals
Turkish military personnel of the Korean War
Democrat Party (Turkey, 1946–1961) politicians
20th-century Turkish politicians
Recipients of the Silver Star
Deputies of Istanbul
Macedonian Turks